The Constitutional Offices Commission is an advisory body that is responsible for providing advice to the President of Fiji for the appointment of key officials within public offices in Fiji.

History 
Established by the 1997 Constitution of Fiji, the Commission originally consisted of a chairperson and two other individuals, all appointed by the President on the advice of the responsible Minister. When the 2013 Constitution of Fiji came into effect, the Commission was re-established but came with many changes including the Prime Minister being a member of the Commission and chairperson.

On 17 April 2015, the Commission held its first meeting since the 2006 coup under the premiership of Frank Bainimarama. Bainimarama's appointee was Ajith Kodagoda. Other members of the meeting included Attorney-General Aiyaz Sayed-Khaiyum, Opposition Leader Teimumu Kepa and her appointee, lawyer Richard Naidu.

Controversy 
In November 2015, Ben Groenewald resigned as Police Commissioner citing military interference. Frank Bainimarama as chairperson of the Commission then advised President Epeli Nailatikau to appoint Sitiveni Qiliho who is a senior military officer. Teimumu Kepa called on Bainimarama to revoke the appointment stating that it was "inappropriate" and raised concerns about the independence of the police. Richard Naidu resigned from the Commission claiming the body was politicised.

Functions 
According to the 2013 Constitution of Fiji, the Commission is responsible to provide advice to the President in relation to the appointment of key public positions:

Members 
The Commission is composed of six members:

 Prime Minister of Fiji (Chairperson)
 Leader of the Opposition
 Attorney-General of Fiji
 Two individuals selected by the Prime Minister and one by the Opposition Leader.

Current members 
The current members of the Commission are:

References 

Government of Fiji